Tolosa (minor planet designation: 138 Tolosa) is a brightly coloured, stony background asteroid from the inner region of the asteroid belt. It was discovered by French astronomer Henri Joseph Perrotin on 19 May 1874, and named by the Latin and Occitan name ( and ) of the French city of Toulouse.

The spectrum of this asteroid rules out the presence of ordinary chondrites, while leaning in favor of clinopyroxene phases. As of 2006, there are no known meteorites with compositions similar to the spectrum of 138 Tolosa.

References

External links 
 
 

000138
Discoveries by Henri Perrotin
Named minor planets
000138
18740519